Laamu may refer to:

Laamu Atoll, an administrative division of the Maldives.
Laamu, the 14th consonant of the Thaana abugaida used in Dhivehi.